All comers track meets are usually small local events, considered the grassroots of the sport of track and field athletics.  Organization of these meets can range from "professional" to almost disorganized.  Some meets are so small that only a couple of people put the whole thing on.  It's all based on the simple philosophy of the sport;  it only takes two people to hold a race.  The formal elements required are a place for the race to take place, and neutral officials to start and judge the finish of a race.  Multiply that by dozens to hundreds of participants participating over the spectrum of track and field events and you have a meet.

All comers track meets have been long standing traditions held in most major cities across the United States and Canada.  Some series have a history going back over 50 years.  There are generally two seasons when these occur, those seasons being outside of the formal scholastic season.  There is a winter season (indoors in most areas but outdoors in warmer areas like California and Florida) starting in December and going through the end of February (when scholastic seasons begin); and a summer season that starts around the beginning of June and goes into August.  Some meets, perhaps without the all comers moniker, do occur during the scholastic season with the specific intent of providing athletes an additional attempt to achieve qualifying times for post season meets.  Generally the September to November time period is considered cross country season in track circles, which parallels with football season at the stadiums where a track meet might be held, so all comers meets during that period are rare.  A regularly updated listing of such meets is kept on the directory North American All Comers Meet Directory.  In June 2009, this site listed over fifty active all comer track meet series in North America.

The phrase all comers literally means anybody who shows up is welcome to participate.  Meets using the actual term occur in North America, Oceana and English speaking Asia.  On various ends of the spectrum, that has meant 3-year-old children, 100-year-old Senior Athletes, "Special" athletes or Olympic level elite athletes.

In order to create the best circumstances for each athlete, most events are seeded.  Some meets are formally organized with all races prepared by registering hours or days in advance, some just break people up by their age groups, less formal meets might just ask the athletes standing at the start line how fast they plan on running.  Don't be surprised if the Olympic champion or world record holder squeezes through the crowd to take a center lane in the "fast" race, but a meet could also be totally dominated by children under 14.

Each meet can choose to limit or define the events they wish to hold, some limited to running events, sprints, jumps or throws.  Occasionally meets are called "all comers" but are actually limited by the age groups served or have qualifying standards that entrants must have achieved in order to enter.  Many of those requirements are set because of the limitations of the facilities or the number of volunteers available.  Most of the people who serve as meet organizers bend over backwards to hold events that have a demand, meaning if you have a bunch of people who want to do something special this is probably the best venue to ask to do it.

Records
USATF keeps American records for All-Comers Meets.

Fortune Gordien set the world record in the discus throw at a 1953 all-comers meet in Pasadena, California that lasted almost six years.  Guinness Book of Track and Field: Facts and Feats called the audience of 48, the smallest crowd ever to witness a world record.

Notable all comers series
DCRRC Track Championships, Washington, D.C. metropolitan area, started 1997
 LAUSD Series Los Angeles, CA, started 1962
 Los Gatos Series (San Jose, CA area) started 1980
 Club Northwest Series, Shoreline, WA, (Seattle area) started 1969
 Hal Martin All Comers Series, Rochester, MN started 1973
 Atlanta Track Club Series, Atlanta, GA
 Potomac Valley Series Washington, D.C.
 University of Chicago Series, Chicago, IL

References

External links
 North American All Comers Meet Directory

Athletics (track and field) competitions
Track and field in the United States
Track and field in Canada